Äspö Hard Rock Laboratory (Äspölaboratoriet) is a research site located outside Oskarshamn in Kalmar County, Sweden.  The laboratory is located in the Misterhult archipelago, near the Oskarshamn Nuclear Power Plant (Oskarshamns Kärnkraftverk).

General information
The Äspö Hard Rock Laboratory is a research facility for future geological disposal of spent nuclear fuel. The plant is owned and operated by Svensk Nuclear Fuel Management AB (Svensk Kärnbränslehantering AB). It was built to test different methods and possibilities for final disposal of spent nuclear fuel. At the laboratory a series of experiments are performed at depths of  into the bedrock. The laboratory is used by both Swedish and international experts.

Much of the research is done for the construction of the future Spent Fuel Repository. There is no spent nuclear fuel on the site which makes it possible to keep the Äspö laboratory open to the public.

References

External links
 Information at the Svensk Kärnbränslehantering webpage

Oskarshamn
Nuclear power in Sweden
Radioactive waste repositories
Tourist attractions in Kalmar County